Lost in Random is an action-adventure video game developed by Zoink and published by Electronic Arts. Part of the EA Originals program, the game was released for Microsoft Windows, Nintendo Switch, PlayStation 4, PlayStation 5, Xbox One and Xbox Series X/S in September 2021.

Premise
In the Kingdom of Random, the fate of all individuals is decided by a cursed black die when they reach the age of 12. Even's sister, Odd, is abducted by the wicked Queen of  Random. As Even journeys across the six realms of Random to rescue her sister, she meets Dicey, a sentient dice who has lost nearly all of its pips. In a world which is governed by game rules, Even will slowly understand the randomness of life with the help of Dicey.

Gameplay
Lost in Random is an action-adventure game played from a third-person perspective. Combat happens in arenas that look like a game board. Players must roll Dicey in order to progress and Even will only be safe when she reaches the final piece on the board. In combat, the player can use Even's slingshot. While it does not damage enemies, opponents hit by her slingshot drop energy cubes which fuel Dicey. Once Dicey is fully fueled, players can roll it and time will be temporarily stopped. During this period, players can select the card they want to use, which is the only way to deal damage to enemies. There are five different types of cards (Weapon, Damage, Defense, Hazard, and Cheat), offering different gameplay advantages and combat abilities. For instance, one of the cards turns Dicey into an explosive cube, while another allows players to place traps. Cards can be earned through collecting coins. As players progress, new cards will be earned and they will recover Dicey's lost pips, which would enable Even to roll higher numbers during combat.

The game also features light role-playing game elements. When Dicey and Even are exploring the Kingdom of Random, they will meet various non-playable characters. The game features a dialogue wheel which allows players to select dialogue options while conversing with NPCs.

Development
The game is developed by Swedish developer Zoink. According to Olov Redmalm, the game's creative director, Lost in Random was a homage to "dark fairy tales" and stop-motion animation. During the game's production, the team inspected the works of animation studio Laika, movies directed by Tim Burton, Grimms' Fairy Tales, and the Oddworld series for inspirations. Each realm features its own visual design, with art style inspired by The Nightmare Before Christmas, Over the Garden Wall, and the works of Australian artist Shaun Tan. The game was penned by Ryan North, who had previously worked on The Unbeatable Squirrel Girl and the Adventure Time TV series. The game's soundtrack was composed by British composer Blake Robinson, who had previously worked on Portal Knights and The Stanley Parable.

Publisher Electronic Arts, which had partnered with Zoink previously with Fe (2017), announced the game at EA Play 2019. The game was an "EA Originals", a segment of EA's publishing aimed to help indie developers with financing and publishing of their titles to reach a wider audience without EA being as involved in the game's development, thus allowing the studio to take more of a share of sales revenues. The game competed for the inaugural Tribeca Games Award and was included as an official selection. The game was released on 10 September 2021 for Microsoft Windows, Nintendo Switch, PlayStation 4, PlayStation 5, Xbox One and Xbox Series X and Series S.

Reception 

Lost in Random received "generally favourable" reviews, according to review aggregator Metacritic.

Destructoid praised each of the six realms, feeling that they were distinct from each other in non-visual ways, "Zoink does a good job of theming each world after its numerical, dice-based namesake. There’s an amusing logic to how each realm operates. Seeing those quirks play out as Even, a total newcomer, is pretty entertaining". Rock Paper Shotgun liked the atmosphere of Random's world, noting its Burtonian influences, "Everyone teeters on long spindly limbs, and they're either gremlins with upside down faces, or withered trees wearing top hats. They're all amusing too, with a few sending you on more original and fun side quests to break up the linear ride. I traded complicated words with an auntie catfish, for instance". Game Informer enjoyed how the combat system mixed real-time action with deck-building, feeling it was a completely unique take on both genres, "The system is genuinely creative, smoothly executed, and every layer works in tandem to create a unique experience". While criticizing the length of combat encounters, IGN felt the characters helped plot become more memorable, "Incredibly memorable characters like Mannie Dex, Seemore, Herman, Ooma, The Nanny, and so many others make moving to the next world kind of like watching the next movie in a 20-hour series of timeless holiday classics".

Kotaku liked the game's side-quests, stating they often were hilarious, "I had a great time just poking my head into every nook and cranny of the various realms, looking for characters to talk to and side-quests to complete... The range of dialogue options and the ways in which they impact the game are yet another reason I had such a good time exploring and talking to everyone I met". Nintendo World Report disliked how long quests and combat encounters took to complete, "The biggest hurdle in Lost in Random is the pacing of the game. It frequently drags out quests and missions to a point where it can feel simply tedious to walk all the way across the town again to find a specific item".

References

External links
 

2021 video games
Action-adventure games
Dark fantasy video games
Electronic Arts games
Nintendo Switch games
PlayStation 4 games
PlayStation 5 games
Single-player video games
Video games developed in Sweden
Windows games
Xbox One games
Xbox Series X and Series S games
Zoink games